Russian Agricultural Bank (RusAg) is a 100% state-owned bank regulated by the Bank of Russia. RusAg is providing lending support to Russian agribusiness.

History
Modern agribusiness production systems are capital intensive. A large portion of capital used in agribusiness is borrowed. The agrarian credit system in Russia goes back to 1882 when the first specialized banks –‘Peasant Land Bank’ and ‘Gentry Land Bank’ – were established. During the Soviet period, about 90% of all long-term loans were extended to agribusiness. 

Russian Agricultural Bank (RusAg) was set up on March 15, 2000 under the special Decree of the Acting President of the Russian Federation Vladimir Putin with the mission to be the conductor of the state credit and financial policy in the agribusiness sector, to facilitate a strong performance by clients, to invest in the core businesses and technology and to be the basis of the national credit and financial system of agribusiness in the Russian Federation.

100% of RusAg’s shares are controlled by the Russian Federation acting through the Federal Agency for Managing State Property which holds the Bank’s issued and outstanding ordinary shares (78.66% from total share capital (31 December 2018: 77.11% from total share capital)), the Ministry of Finance of the Russian Federation which holds the Bank’s issued and outstanding preference shares (5.69% from total share capital (31 December 2018: 6.1% from total share capital)) and the State Corporation “Deposit Insurance Agency” which holds the Bank’s issued and outstanding preference shares (15.65% from total share capital (31 December 2018: 16.79% from total share capital)).

Sanctions
On February 24, 2022, US President Joe Biden imposed economic sanctions on RusAg and other Russian financial institutions in response to Russia's invasion of Ukraine.

References

External links

  
 Annual report 2019
 Meeting with Rosselkhozbank (Russian Agricultural Bank) Board Chairman Boris Listov
 Russian Agricultural Bank from Moscow, Russia is ranked  in the Top 1000 World Banks by Tier 1 2020
 Russian Agricultural Bank shrugs off crisis thanks to specialist focus
 Russian Agricultural Bank to get $137 million capital injection

Banks of Russia
Russian brands
Companies based in Moscow
Banks established in 2000
Russian companies established in 2000
Government-owned companies of Russia
Russian entities subject to the U.S. Department of the Treasury sanctions
Government-owned banks